Aspindza is a daba ("small town") in southern Georgia's region of Samtskhe-Javakheti with a population of 2,793 (2014 census), mostly ethnic Georgians.

History
The word "Aspindza" derives from a Persian word "اسب انداز", which means "a place to rest". The year of the foundation the town is considered to be 888, as Leonti Mroveli tells - 

 

By the end of the 16th century Aspindza had been conquered by the Ottoman Turks. According to their census, "Aspindza was a big village, that consisted of 50 families with gardens and orchards". The village  is mentioned in chronicle of Sumbat Davitisdze and Vakhushti.

Literature
Georgian Soviet Encyclopedia, article ასპინძა.

See also
 Samtskhe-Javakheti

References

External links
 Aspindza District

Cities and towns in Samtskhe–Javakheti